Kızıltoprak railway station was a station in Kadıköy, Istanbul. It consisted of two side platforms serving two tracks. The original station was built in 1872 by the Ottoman government as part of the railway from Istanbul to İzmit and taken over by the Ottoman Anatolian Railway in 1888. In 1949 the station was expanded by the Turkish State Railways to accommodate two tracks and 29 May 1969, electric commuter trains began serving the Kızıltoprak. The station was closed on 19 February 2013 when all commuter trains were suspended to make way for the new Marmaray commuter rail system. Along with Kanarya, Kızıltoprak station was closed down permanently in 2013 and the platforms were demolished shortly after.

References

Railway stations in Istanbul Province
Railway stations opened in 1872
Railway stations closed in 2013
Defunct railway stations in Turkey
1872 establishments in  the Ottoman Empire
Transport in Kadıköy